The Workers' Party of Korea Publishing House (WPKPH) is the principal publishing house of the Workers' Party of Korea (WPK) and one of the two main publishers in the country. It publishes magazines and books on politics, such as the works of Kim Il-sung and Kim Jong-il, posters and works of fiction. The current director-general and editor-in-chief is Ri Yong-chol.

Organization
The publishing house is under the control of the WPK's Propaganda and Agitation Department and is the party's most important publisher. It was founded in October 1945 in Pyongyang, where it is still based. It is one of the two main publishers in North Korea, the other one being the Foreign Languages Publishing House.

Directors
The current director-general and editor-in-chief is Ri Yong-chol.

 Kim Yong-hak (1980s)
 Yang Kyong-pok (1990s)
 Ryang Kyong-bok (2000s)
 Ri Yong-chol (2010s)

Publications
The publishing house publishes books on politics as well as fiction. According to North Korean sources, they include:

This includes works of Kim Il-sung and Kim Jong-il in Korean, including their selected (sŏnjip), collected (chŏjakchip) and complete works (chŏnjip).

In addition to books, it publishes posters and the magazine Kulloja, the theoretical monthly of the party. During the Cold War, it published works of the leader of communist Romania Nicolae Ceaușescu in return for Editura Politică publishing those of Kim Il-sung.

Some multi-volume publications by the publishing house include:
 Among the People
 Collection of Kim Il-sung's Anecdotes
 General Kim Jong-il, Sun of Songun
 Glorifying the Era of Juche
 History of Anti-Japanese Armed Struggle (Enlarged Edition)
 Complete Collection of Kim Il-sung's Works
 Complete Collection of Kim Il-sung's Works (Enlarged Edition)
 Complete Collection of Kim Jong-il's Works
 Reminiscences of the Anti-Japanese Guerillas
 Selected Works of Kim Jong-il (Enlarged Edition)
 With the Century

See also

 Kim Il-sung bibliography
 Kim Jong-il bibliography
 Kim Jong-un bibliography
 North Korean literature
 List of magazines in North Korea

References

Citations

Works cited

External links
 Workers' Party of Korea Publishing House at K-Scholar 

1945 establishments in Korea
Publishing companies of North Korea
Political book publishing companies
Mass media in Pyongyang
Workers' Party of Korea